The 2022 European Taekwondo Championships, the 25th edition of the European Taekwondo Championships, was held in Manchester, United Kingdom at the Manchester Regional Arena from 19 to 22 May 2022.

Medal table

Medal summary

Men

Women

Para Taekwondo

Medal table

Medal summary

Men

Women

References

External links 
 Results
 Day 1 results
 Day 1 Para results
 Day 2 results
 Day 2 Para results
 Day 3 results
 Day 3 Para results
 Day 4 results
 Day 4 Para results

European Taekwondo Championships
European Championships
International taekwondo competitions hosted by England
Sports competitions in Manchester
European Taekwondo Championships
European Taekwondo Championships
Taekwondo